The Himalayan field mouse (Apodemus gurkha) is a species of rodent in the family Muridae.
It is endemic to Nepal.

References

Sources

Rats of Asia
Endemic fauna of Nepal
Fauna of the Himalayas
Mammals of Nepal
Apodemus
Mammals described in 1924
Taxa named by Oldfield Thomas
Taxonomy articles created by Polbot